Mount Elizabeth Novena Hospital, is a 333-bed healthcare facility  in Singapore that opened on 2 July 2012. It is owned by Parkway Health.

Prices ranged from between S$3,588 per square foot and S$3,828 per square foot.
 It introduced Class A single rooms in 2013, priced at S$418, about 35% less than rates for standard single rooms. All rooms have floor-to-ceiling windows, marble bathrooms, mini bar, coffee machines and luxury linen. Limousine transfer services and complimentary massages for maternity patients are also included in the price.  About 30% of the patients are medical tourists.

References

External links

Hospitals in Singapore
2012 establishments in Singapore